Ptelea railway stop is a railway stop situated halfway between Dikaia and Ormenio that serves the nearby village of Ptelea, Evros, in Eastern Macedonia and Thrace, Greece. Today TrainOSE operates just 4 daily Regional trains to Alexandroupoli. The stop is unstaffed

History
The railway was an important link during World War I as the Ottoman Empire, Bulgaria, and Austria-Hungary were all Central Allies. After the Ottoman Empire's defeat, its remaining imperial possessions were divided.

Under the Treaty of Lausanne of 1923, a new border between Greece and Turkey was established at the Evros river, just east of Ftelia railway station, which had the result that the railway from Istanbul to Bulgaria entered Greece at Pythio, then re-entered Turkey at Edirne (Karaağaç railway station), re-entered Greece at Marasia, and finally entered Bulgaria between Ormenio and Svilengrad.  This arrangement continued until 1971 when two new lines were opened. In Turkey, the Edirne Cut-off was opened to allow trains from Istanbul to Bulgaria to run through Edirne entirely on Turkish territory so that trains such as the Orient Express no longer passed through Feres. In Greece, a line was opened to allow trains from Pythio to Bulgaria to stay on Greek territory and avoid Edirne. In 1954 the CFFH was absorbed by the Hellenic State Railways. In 1971, the Hellenic State Railways was reorganised into the OSE taking over responsibilities for most for Greece's rail infrastructure.

In the 1990s, OSE introduced the InterCity service to the Alexandroupoli–Svilengrad line Which reduced travel times across the whole line.

In 2020 it was announced that the section of line between Pythio and Ormenio was to be upgraded, at the cost of €1.4 million as part of an ambitious integrated intergovernmental transport plan which will see this, and 39 other transport sector projects be built, with financing from the European Commission with a total of €117 million. The package of measures aims to build or improve transport connections and connectivity across Europe, with a focus on sustainable transport. The project for the Pythian-Ormenio section envisions upgrading the existing line infrastructure and trackbed, doubling of the track as well as the installation of electrification signalling (ETCS Level 1) along the entire stretch, with the aim of improving freight transport with Bulgaria and Turkey.

Facilities
The station has no facilities. The platforms have no outside seating, Dot-matrix display departure and arrival screens or timetable poster boards for passenger information, and the station remains little more than an unstaffed halt.

Services
, the stop is only served by one daily pair of regional trains Alexandroupoli–Ormenio. There are currently no services to Svilengrad.

Line layout

References

Railway stations in Eastern Macedonia and Thrace
Buildings and structures in Evros (regional unit)